Roberta Fulton Fox (November 25, 1943 – August 9, 2009) was a Florida attorney, politician, and feminist.

She was born on November 25, 1943, and earned her law degree from the University of Florida, Fredric G. Levin College of Law. On June 10, 1968, Fox was admitted to the Florida State Bar. She practiced law with her husband Mike Gold. In addition to being an attorney, Fox served as a member of the Florida House of Representatives (1976-1982) and the Florida Senate (1982-1986). During her time in politics, she focused on issues such as family law reform—especially with regard to women’s and children’s rights. Fox died on August 9, 2009 after battling breast cancer.

References 

Florida lawyers
Members of the Florida House of Representatives
Florida state senators
University of Florida alumni
1943 births
2009 deaths
Women state legislators in Florida
20th-century American women lawyers
20th-century American lawyers
20th-century American politicians
20th-century American women politicians
21st-century American women